The Ivy League public policy schools outlines the universities within the Ivy League that offer public policy or public administration degrees. These public policy schools often provide Bachelor of Arts (BA), Master of Public Policy (MPP), Master of Public Administration (MPA), Master of International Affairs, or Doctor of Philosophy in Public Policy and/or Administration degrees. The public policy programs at the Ivy League rank as some of the best in the world.

The oldest program for the study of public policy and administration began at Princeton University in 1930, founded as the School of Public and International Affairs. The school's mission was to prepare students for "leadership in public and international affairs" in accordance with President Woodrow Wilson who desired a school that could train students for public service. Harvard University soon followed with their own school, the Graduate School of Public Administration, in 1936.

The most recently established school of government was at Yale University through the Jackson Institute for Global Affairs in 2010. The goal of the Jackson Institute was to enhance the university's current offerings of social science research and courses. The Institute currently specializes in international affairs, but is planning to expand to domestic policy in the near future.

These schools have served as the model for other programs around the world, most notably at Oxford University. The Blavatnik School of Government was founded in 2010 and is the first of its kind in Europe. It currently offers MPP and DPhil in Public Policy degrees. Pundits believe the Blavatnik School seeks to differentiate itself with a more well-rounded curriculum, thereby competing with the American monopoly on public policy schools.

List

Academics
Many schools allow students to specialize in certain policy areas. Depending on the university's specialty, these fields may include domestic policy, foreign policy, health policy, urban policy, economic policy, international affairs, security studies, and more. Students who graduate these programs often work in various branches of government or at NGOs. Some graduates may also go on to work in the private sector or academia.

Rankings
Based on research output, Princeton's Woodrow Wilson School ranks as No. 1 out of all policy schools, followed by Harvard's Kennedy School and Columbia's SIPA. Based on number of publications, the Kennedy School ranks No. 1, followed by the Wilson School and SIPA.

The Ivy League's international relations programs are ranked in Foreign Policy's "Best International Relations Schools in the World" article. The rankings provide a glimpse of international relations as an academic and professional discipline, aggregating responses from 1,514 international relations scholars at U.S. colleges and universities around the country.

See also
Public policy school
Johns Hopkins University's School of Advanced International Studies
Tufts University's Fletcher School of Law and Diplomacy
Oxford University's Blavatnik School of Government

References

Ivy League